DWHS may refer to:
 DeLand-Weldon High School, Piatt County, Illinois, United States
 Desert Winds High School, Casa Grande, Arizona, United States
 Dormers Wells High School, Ealing, London, England